Albert Edward Rayner (13 August 1932 – 5 April 2022) was an English footballer who played in the Football League for Stoke City.

Career
Rayner was born in Salford and played for Northwich Victoria before joining Stoke City in 1956. He spent four years at the Victoria Ground being used as a back-up, making just four appearances. He later played for Chelmsford City, Macclesfield Town and Hyde United.

Career statistics

References

1932 births
2022 deaths
English footballers
Footballers from Salford
Association football midfielders
English Football League players
Stoke City F.C. players
Northwich Victoria F.C. players
Chelmsford City F.C. players
Macclesfield Town F.C. players
Hyde United F.C. players